The Tboli people are one of the indigenous peoples of South Cotabato in southern Mindanao. In the body of ethnographic and linguistic literature on Mindanao, their name is variously spelt Tboli, T'boli, Tböli, Tagabili, Tagabilil, Tagabulul and Tau Bilil. Their endonym is Tboli. Their whereabouts and identity are somewhat imprecise in the literature; some publications present the Tboli and the Tagabili as distinct peoples; some locate the Tbolis in the vicinity of Lake Buluan in the Cotabato Basin or in Agusan del Norte. The Tbolis, then, reside on the mountain slopes on either side of the upper Alah Valley and the coastal area of Maitum, Maasim and Kiamba. In former times, the Tbolis also inhabited the upper floor of the Alah Valley. After World War II and the arrival of settlers from other parts of the Philippines, they have been gradually pushed to the mountain slopes. As of now, they have almost been expelled from the fertile valley floor.

Like their immediate neighbouring tribes, the Úbûs, Blàan, Blit, Tàú-Segél, and the Tasaday, they have been variously termed hill tribes, pagans, animists, etc., as opposed to indigenous Muslim peoples or Christian settlers. In political contexts, however, the word "Lumad" (from the Cebuano for native people) has become a popular umbrella term for the various indigenous peoples of Mindanao.

Music

The Tboli have a musical heritage consisting of various types of agung ensembles – ensembles composed of large hanging, suspended or held, bossed/knobbed gongs that act as drone without any accompanying melodic instrument.

Other instruments include the hegelung.

Tboli religion

The T'boli have a highly complex and unique religion composed of the life ways and belief systems inherent to their psyche. However, in modern times, their religion has been degraded to an extent due to the influence of Catholicism, Protestantism, and Islam. Nevertheless, some communities continue to preserve the religion practices of their ancestors, which is thousands of years old.

Immortals

Bulon La Mogoaw: one of two supreme deities; married to Kadaw La Sambad; lives in the seventh layer of the universe
Kadaw La Sambad: the second supreme deities; married to Bulon La Mogoaw; lives in the seventh layer of the universe
Cumucul: son of the supreme deities; has a cohort of fire, a sword, and shield; married to Boi’Kafil
Boi’Kafil: daughter of the supreme deities; married to Cumucul
Bong Libun: daughter of the supreme deities; married to S’fedat; could not bear children
S’fedat: son of the supreme deities; married to Bong Libun; could not bear children; asked Bong Libun to instead kill him, where his body became the land from which plants spout from
D’wata: son of the supreme deities; married to both Sedek We and Hyu We; placed the land-body of S’fedat on the sea
Sedek We: daughter of the supreme deities; married to D’wata
Hyu We: daughter of the supreme deities; married to D’wata
Blotik: son of the supreme deities; married to S’lel
S’lel: daughter of the supreme deities; married to Blotik
B’lomi: daughter of the supreme deities; married to Mule
Mule: son of the supreme deities; married to B’lomi
Loos K’lagan: son of the supreme deities; married to both La Fun and Datu B’noling
La Fun: daughter of the supreme deities; married to Loos K’lagan
Datu B’noling: daughter of the supreme deities; married to Loos K’lagan
Children of D’wata and Hyu We
L’tik
B’langa
Temo Lus
T’dolok
Ginton
L’mugot M’ngay
Fun Bulol: the owner of wild animals
Children of D’wata and Sedek We
Kayung
Slew
S’mbleng
Nagwawang
Nga Hule
S’ntan
Fu: spirits that inhabit and own the natural environment
Fu El: the spirit of water
Fu El Melel: the spirit of the river
D’wata (general): the generic term for the gods; guard lives and determine fate and destiny
Muhen: a god of fate in the form of a bird whose song when heard is thought to presage misfortune; any undertaking is immediately abandoned or postponed when one hears the Muhen sing
Glinton: the god of metallurgy

References

External links
 Photographic and written account of a week spent with the Tboli of Lake Sebu by a traveler
 T'boli elder and child
 Preserving Culture: the T'boli tribe of Mindanao, Philippines by Alan Geoghegan & Ursula Schloer

Lumad
Ethnic groups in Mindanao